Heroes of the Alamo (1937) is a low-budget retelling of the events of the Texas Revolution and the Battle of the Alamo.  It was produced by Anthony J. Xydias and reuses the battle scenes of his 1926 silent film Davy Crockett at the Fall of the Alamo. About 35 minutes of the latter film is available on the DVD of Heroes of the Alamo, all that remains of the silent film.

Plot
Unlike other Alamo films that concentrate on Davy Crockett and Jim Bowie, the main protagonists are Almaron (Bruce Warren) and Susanna Dickinson (Ruth Findlay) and their daughter Angelina (Marilyn Haslett). The film gives a fictionalised fast moving account of the restriction on American emigration to Texas, the arrest of Stephen F. Austin by Santa Anna (Julian Rivero), Sam Houston (Edward Piel) appointed General to build the Texian Army, and Dickinson's participation in both the Battle of Gonzales and the Battle of the Alamo.

Cast
Bruce Warren  ...  Capt. Al Dickinson
Ruth Findlay  ...  Anne Dickinson
Earle Hodgins  ...  Stephen F. Austin
Lane Chandler  ... Col. Davy Crockett
Roger Williams ...  Col. Jim Bowie
Rex Lease  ...  Col. William B. Travis
Jack C. Smith  ...  William H. Wharton
Lee Valanios  ...  Col. James Bonham
Edward Peil Sr.  ...  Gen. Sam Houston
Julian Rivero  ...  Gen. Antonio López de Santa Anna
Willy Castello  ...  Gen. Martín Perfecto de Cos
Paul Ellis  ...  Gen. Manuel Fernández Castrillón

Release
After producing two 1935 Westerns, Xydias ambitiously announced the production of epic films about Buffalo Bill, Sitting Bull, George Armstrong Custer, Daniel Boone and Davy Crockett in 1937-1938 that were remakes of his Sunset Productions silent films, however only the Alamo film was made.  Xydias had planned the film as a tie in with the 1936 Texas Centennial but fell behind in his plans.

Columbia Pictures acquired the film for 1938 release and changed the billing of the actors in the film.

The film featured the song The Yellow Rose of Texas being sung by the defenders though it had not been written at that time.

This was the last film Xydias produced. When World War II broke out he was in the Philippines and was interned by the Japanese.

References

External links
 

1937 films
1937 Western (genre) films
Columbia Pictures films
American black-and-white films
Texas Revolution films
Cultural depictions of Davy Crockett
Siege films
American Western (genre) films
1930s English-language films
1930s American films
Cultural depictions of James Bowie